Zaida Muxí Martínez (born 1964 in Buenos Aires) is an Argentine architect and city planner who graduated in the Faculty of Architecture, Design and Urbanism at the University of Buenos Aires,

Muxí earned her doctorate from the Upper Technical School of Architecture of Seville and later served as professor in the Upper Technical School of Architecture of Barcelona.

She is co-director, with Josep Maria Montaner, of the Máster Laboratory of the House of the 21st century of the Polytechnic University of Catalonia. Muxí collaborates in the supplement Cultura/s of the journal La Vanguardia Her body of work is characterized by her experience of space and gender. Muxí occupied the penultimate place in the list of Ricard Gomà Carmona (ICV) of the candidature in Barcelona for the municipal Elections of Spain of 2011.

Publications 
From 2009 she directed visions, the magazine of the Upper Technical School of Architecture of Barcelona.

References 
EXTERNAL REFERENCES 

 Méndez, Alexis C. “Género y Arquitectura: Una Perspectiva Desde Lo Conceptual: Conversando Con Zaida Muxí = Gender and Architecture: A Conceptual Perspective: Talking with Zaida Muxí.” Arquitectura y Urbanismo 37, no. 1 (January 1, 2016): 71–76.
 Muxí, Zaida. “Private public space: Maremagnum.” In Transforming Barcelona, edited by Tim Marshall, 162–163. London: Routledge, 2004.
 Muxí, Zaida. “Women Architects in the Modern Movement, [by] Carmen Espegel.” ZARCH : Journal of Interdisciplinary Studies in Architecture and Urbanism, no. 13 (December 1, 2019): 301.

Argentine feminists
Argentine women architects
Architects from Buenos Aires
University of Buenos Aires alumni
1964 births
Living people